Ahmed Rashid (Urdu:; born 1948 in Pakistan) is a journalist and best-selling foreign policy author of several books about Afghanistan, Pakistan, and Central Asia.

Life and career
Ahmed Rashid was born in Rawalpindi, Pakistan. He attended Malvern College, England, Government College Lahore, and Fitzwilliam College, Cambridge at Cambridge University in the late 1960s.

After graduating, Rashid spent ten years in the hills of Balochistan, attempting to organise an uprising against the Pakistani military dictatorships of Ayub Khan and Yahya Khan. He ended his guerrilla fighting days frustrated and defeated and turned his attention to writing about his homeland.

He has been the Pakistan, Afghanistan and Central Asia Correspondent for  The Daily Telegraph for more than 20 years  and a correspondent for Far Eastern Economic Review. He also writes for The Wall Street Journal, The Nation, Daily Times (Pakistan) and academic journals. He appears regularly on international TV channels and radio networks such as CNN, BBC World and many Pakistani TV channels.

"Now something of an elder statesman, Mr. Rashid is sought after for advice by diplomats in Islamabad and Kabul, and by policy makers in NATO capitals and Washington."

He is a well known and vocal critic of the Bush administration in relation to the Iraq war and its alleged neglect of the Taliban issue. Rashid's 2000 book, Taliban: Militant Islam, Oil and Fundamentalism in Central Asia, was a New York Times bestseller for five weeks, translated into 22 languages, and has sold 1.5 million copies since the September 11, 2001 attacks, "an astonishing number for an academic press." The book was used extensively by American analysts in the wake of the 9/11 attacks. Rashid charged that former President George W. Bush plagiarized his work in writing  his memoirs.

His commentary also appears in The Washington Post's PostGlobal segment. "Rashid is a regular columnist for leading national and international publications and a frequent guest on NPR's (National Public Radio) Fresh Air."

"An expert on the Taliban -- until 9/11 he knew them better than almost any outsider -- Mr. Rashid has over the decades turned out to be something of a prophet in the region, though mostly of the Cassandra type, issuing repeated warnings that are ignored by policy makers."

Ahmed Rashid is married with two children and lives in Lahore, Punjab, Pakistan.

Selected works
The Resurgence of Central Asia: Islam or Nationalism?, St. Martin's Press (May 1994), .
Taliban: Militant Islam, Oil and Fundamentalism in Central Asia, Yale University Press (March 2000) .
Jihad: The Rise of Militant Islam in Central Asia, Yale University Press (January 25, 2002) . (Hyderabad: Orient Longman, 2002)
Descent into Chaos: The United States and the Failure of Nation Building in Pakistan, Afghanistan, and Central Asia, Viking, 2008, .
Taliban: The Power of Militant Islam in Afghanistan and Beyond, 2nd ed, I.B.Tauris (April 2010), 
Pakistan on the Brink: The Future of America, Pakistan, and Afghanistan, Viking Adult (March 15, 2012), .

See also
The Great Game
The Oil Factor

References

External links

Ahmed Rashid Official website
Contributor from The New York Review of Books
Ahmed Rashid's Columns archive at The Guardian (newspaper)
Ahmed Rashid's Columns archive at Aljazeera (aljazeera.com website)
 TV Networks
C-SPAN Q&A interview with Rashid, May 2, 2010

Profile, The New York Times, 5 July 2008
After the Death of Osama bin Laden: Now to Break the Al-Qaeda Franchise, 19 May 2011
"Worse than Afghanistan" Pakistani writer and Taliban expert Ahmed Rashid reports on the failures of the international community in Mali.

Pakistani male journalists
Pakistani non-fiction writers
Foreign policy writers
Central Asian studies scholars
Alumni of Fitzwilliam College, Cambridge
People educated at Malvern College
1948 births
Living people
Government College University, Lahore alumni
Journalists from Lahore
Pakistani television journalists
Historians of the Islamic State of Iraq and the Levant
Carnegie Council for Ethics in International Affairs
People from Lahore